McCall is a surname. It may also refer to:

People
 C. W. McCall, stage name of American singer and songwriter William Dale Fries, Jr. (1928-2022)
 McCall Salmon, 21st century American college softball coach
 McCall Zerboni (born 1986), American women's soccer player

Places
 McCall, Idaho, United States, a resort town
 McCall Municipal Airport
 McCall College, a private college
 McCall, Illinois, United States, an unincorporated community
 McCall Glacier, Washington, United States
 McCall Point, Graham Land, Antarctica
 McCall Street, Waukesha, Wisconsin, United States - see McCall Street Historic District

Other uses
 , a United States Navy destroyer which served in World War I
 , a United States Navy destroyer which served in World War II
 McCall Corporation, a defunct American publishing company
 McCall's, an American women's magazine (1897–2001)
 McCall Field, a former name of Calgary International Airport, Calgary, Alberta, Canada
 McCall Elementary School (disambiguation), various schools in the United States

See also
 McCall House (disambiguation), various houses on the United States National Register of Historic Places